Mira Mezini (born 18 November 1966 in Albania) is a German computer scientist and Professor of Computer Science at the Department of Computer Science of the Technische Universität Darmstadt. She heads the software engineering group.

She is known for her research on programming languages, intelligent software development environments, modular software architectures, and software security.

Life 
Mezini was born in Albania. From 1984 she studied computer science at the University of Tirana obtaining her diploma in computer science in 1989. She then worked as a research and teaching assistant at the university. From 1990 to 1992 she worked at the Computer Center of the University of Siegen and then again as research and teaching assistant at their College of Electrical Engineering and Computer Science. In 1997, she received her PhD in computer science from the University of Siegen. The title of her PhD thesis was "Variational Object-Oriented Programming Beyond Classes and Inheritance". From 1999 she was assistant professor for three years at Northeastern University. In 2002, she became Professor of Computer Science at the Department of Computer Science of TU Darmstadt. From 2014 to 2016 she was Vice President for Knowledge and Technology Transfer and then Vice President for Research at TU Darmstadt.

She is also a board member of ATHENE, the largest research center for IT security in Europe.

Mira Mezini is married and has one daughter.

Awards, honors and outstanding positions in the research community 
In 1984, Mezini received the Gold Medal of Ministry of Education, Sports and Youth. In 2005 and 2006 she received the IBM Eclipse Innovation Award. In 2012, Mezini received an ERC Advanced Grant of 2.3 million euros, the European Union's highest endowed grant. In 2013, she received an honorary doctorate from the University of Tirana. In 2016, she became member of the German Academy of Science and Engineering (acatech). In 2019, she received an ERC Proof of Concept-Grant for the project "Programming Abstractions for Applications in Cloud Environments (PACE)".

She is a member of various committees, including the Computer Science Review Board of the German Research Foundation DFG, the international START/Wittgenstein Jury of the Austrian Science Fund and the Executive Committee of SIGPLAN - Special Interest Group for Programming Languages - of the Association for Computing Machinery (ACM). In addition, Mezini is one of the representatives in the Quadriga to the National Pact for Cybersecurity and in 2020 was appointed to the ERC Scientific Council Search Committee by the European Commissioner for Innovation, Research, Culture, Education and Youth.

References 

1966 births
Academic staff of Technische Universität Darmstadt
Living people
German computer scientists
European Research Council grantees